Pedro Gil Street (formerly Herran Street) is an east-west inner city street and a tertiary national road in south-central Manila, Philippines. The street is served by the Pedro Gil LRT Station along Taft Avenue and the Paco railway station along Quirino Avenue. It also continues towards the central Metro Manila cities of Mandaluyong and San Juan across the Pasig River as New Panaderos and General Kalentong Streets.

The street was named after Pedro Gil, a Filipino diplomat and legislator from Manila. It was previously known as Herran Street, after José de la Herrán, a Spanish captain during the Battle of Manila Bay.

Route description
From the east, Pedro Gil Street originates at the intersection with Calderon and New Panaderos Streets fronting the Santa Ana Church in Santa Ana district, where it is divided by a median of greenery and sculptures known as Plaza Felipe Calderon. Heading west, it passes by the Santa Ana Market before it narrows into a four-lane undivided road west of Medel Street. Continuing past old heritage houses and a few commercial establishments, Pedro Gil crosses into the northern portion of San Andres and Paco districts where it is interrupted by the Paco railway station and Quirino Avenue. The downtown portion of Paco, as well as Ermita and Malate, lie across this intersection passing by the Paco Church, Robinsons Manila shopping mall, and universities such as University of the Philippines Manila and Saint Paul University Manila. The Ermita-Malate portion in which the street serves as boundary also contains several hotels like the New World Manila Bay Hotel (formerly Hyatt Hotel & Casino Manila). Roxas Boulevard lies at its western end.

The street is mostly a two-way road as its sections between Quirino Avenue and Peñafrancia Street and between Agoncillo Street and Roxas Boulevard are one-way eastbound.

History
The origin of Pedro Gil Street could be traced back to from an old road that connected Paco and Santa Ana, based on an 1821 map. In the 19th century, it was later extended to the west towards Calle Real (now Del Pilar Street), effectively connecting such then-towns with the old national road.

The road in Malate, Ermita, and Paco was named Calzada de Paco (as it provides access to Paco) and later as Calle Herran (after the Spanish captain José de la Herrán, who fought during the Battle of Manila Bay). Through Paco, it was known as Calle Real and past Estero Beata, it was known as Calle Dulumbayan (from dulo ng bayan, meaning "the edge of town"). The name Calle Real also applied to the east up to Santa Ana. Its section leading to Santa Ana was historically known as Carretera de Sta. Ana. Its present-day section divided by Plaza Felipe Calderon in Santa Ana was known as Calle Sta. Maria. The street was later extended to the west towards what is now Roxas Boulevard. Its section from General Luna eastwards was also one of the right-of-way alignments of tranvía that existed until 1945.

Its section between General Luna and Tejeron also formed part of Highway 21 that linked Manila to Calamba, Laguna by circumscribing Laguna de Bay through the province of Rizal. 

Herran Street was renamed to Pedro Gil Street after the death of its namesake, Pedro Gil, in 1965.

Intersections

Landmarks

Pedro Gil Street is home to a number educational institutions, such as the University of the Philippines Manila, Saint Paul University Manila and Philippine Christian University in Malate, the Colegio de la Inmaculada Concepcion de la Concordia, Paco Catholic School, Fernando Maria Guerrero Elementary School in Paco, and OB Montessori Center in Santa Ana. It is also the location of Robinsons Manila shopping mall, New World Manila Bay Hotel and Casino, and Hotel Kimberly in the tourist zone just east of Roxas Boulevard. The street also provides access to the San Fernando de Dilao Church (Paco Church) and Paraiso ng Batang Maynila community park, as well as the Nuestra Señora de los Desamparados Church (Santa Ana Church) and Plaza Felipe Calderon located at the street's eastern end. Santa Ana Public Market and Paco Market are the biggest wholesale markets located on Pedro Gil Street. It is served by Pedro Gil station on Taft Avenue and Paco station at its intersection with Quirino Avenue. The Santa Ana Ferry Terminal is also located near the Santa Ana Church.

See also
 Major roads in Manila
 List of renamed streets in Manila

References

Streets in Manila
Ermita
Malate, Manila
Paco, Manila
Santa Ana, Manila